Ingalls Shipbuilding is a shipyard located in Pascagoula, Mississippi, United States, originally established in 1938, and now part of HII. It is a leading producer of ships for the United States Navy, and at 12,500 employees, the second largest private employer in Mississippi.

History

In 1938, Ingalls Shipbuilding Corporation was founded by Robert Ingersoll Ingalls Sr. (1882–1951) of Birmingham, Alabama, on the East Bank of the Pascagoula River in Mississippi. Ingalls was located where the Pascagoula River runs into the Gulf of Mexico. It started out building commercial ships including , which took part in Liberty Fleet Day on 27 September 1941. In the 1950s, Ingalls started bidding on Navy work, winning a contract in 1957 to build 12 nuclear-powered attack submarines.

Litton Industries acquired Ingalls in 1961 and in 1968 expanded its facilities to the other side of the river. Ingalls reached a high point of employment in 1977, with 27,280 workers. In April 2001, Litton was acquired by the Northrop Grumman Corporation.

On 29 August 2005, Ingalls facilities were damaged by Hurricane Katrina; most of the ships in dock and construction escaped serious harm. While shipbuilding was halted for a while due to the destruction of many buildings, most vehicles and the large overhead cranes are the same that the facility continues to operate today.

On 31 March 2011, Northrop Grumman spun off its shipbuilding sector (including Ingalls Shipbuilding) into a new corporation, Huntington Ingalls Industries.

In 2015, Ingalls Shipbuilding Company signed a contract with US Navy for new destroyers, littoral combat ships, and new landing craft.  was one of the first new destroyers and was launched on 28 March.

On 21 March 2015, the new  ship  was ceremonially christened. The vessel was launched on 30 October and was commissioned in 2017.

On 27 March 2015, the shipyard received construction contracts for their next destroyers. Ingalls Shipbuilding Company was awarded a $604.3 million contract modification for building .

On 31 March 2015, the shipyard also received another contract with a $500 million fixed price to build the eighth National Security Cutter (NSC) for the US Coast Guard. Most of them will be under construction until 2019. The cutters are the most advanced ships ever built for the Coast Guard.

On 30 June 2016, Ingalls Shipbuilding signed a contract with US Navy to build the U.S. Navy's next large-deck amphibious assault warship. The contract included planning, advanced engineering, and procurement of long-lead material, is just over $272 million. If options are exercised, the cumulative value of the contract would be $3.1 billion

Products
Ingalls' primary product has been naval ships and naval projects for Egypt, Israel, and Venezuela.  In the 1940s, Ingalls attempted to enter the diesel locomotive market.  They cataloged an extensive product line, but only one example, known as the model 4-S, was produced.  It was sold to the Gulf, Mobile & Ohio Railroad.  Ingalls also manufactured covered hopper railroad cars in the early 1980s, producing around 4,000 units, primarily for the lease market via North American Car.

Ships built
Ships built by Ingalls include:

Submarines
Barbel class:

Skipjack class:

Thresher/Permit class:

Sturgeon class:

Destroyers
Spruance class:

Kidd class:

Arleigh Burke class:

Cruisers
Ticonderoga class:

Cutters
Legend class:

Amphibious transport dock
San Antonio class:

Amphibious assault ship
Iwo Jima class:

Tarawa class:

Wasp class:

America class:

Attack transport
s

Corvette
Sa'ar 5 class:
INS Eilat (501)
INS Lahav (502)
INS Hanit (503)

Tankers
T5 tanker prototype, 615-foot vessel intended for possible conversion to atomic power, 1958

Cruise ships and ocean liners
  for naval architect George G. Sharp, 1946
, an ocean liner for Moore-MacCormack and launched in 1957.
 , also built for Moore-MacCormack and the last ocean liner to be fully completed in the United States as of 2015.
  (partially built in Mississippi, then towed to Germany for outfitting)

Ships refitted

References

External links

 Official website

Pascagoula, Mississippi
Defunct locomotive manufacturers of the United States
Northrop Grumman
Shipbuilding companies of the United States
Companies based in Mississippi
Buildings and structures in Jackson County, Mississippi
Vehicle manufacturing companies established in 1938
Defense companies of the United States
1938 establishments in Mississippi
American companies established in 1938
Manufacturing companies based in Mississippi